Kumaranallur  is a village in Kottayam district in the state of Kerala, India.

Demographics
 India census, Kumaranallur had a population of 16004 with 7645 males and 8359 females.

References

Villages in Kozhikode district
Kozhikode east